Elizabeth Claire Liddell (born 24 May 1937) is a Scottish pianist and composer. She was born in Glasgow and studied at the Royal Scottish Academy of Music and Drama in Glasgow and the Royal College of Music in London with William Lloyd Webber.

In The Kinding Fire Liddell sets 12 songs by Robert Burns using the original airs to which he set his verses, with her accompaniments. An LP recording was issued in 1974 with Liddell on piano. She has also written educational music and text books, inclusding The Book of Keyboard Harmony (1979) and So you Want to Play by Ear (1980).

Works
Liddell is known for arrangements of Scottish folk songs and poetry to music. Her selected works include:
The Kindling Fire, 12 Burns songs (1974)
Five Orkney Scenes (1975), song cycle, text George Mackay Brown
Orphead: A Spell for Rain (1978),  text George Mackay Brown
 Three Ballads (1989), settings of J.C. Mathieson from French poetry
Ca' the yowes for soprano and piano
 The Rhythm of Life (1985) song cycle for female voice and piano, text Alice Meynell
Melody and Country Style for Violin and Piano
Three Piano Pieces

References

External links
 Catriona Hewitson sings 'The Beachcomber' from Five Orkney Scenes

20th-century classical composers
21st-century classical composers
British music educators
Women classical composers
Living people
Scottish classical composers
Scottish classical pianists
Scottish women pianists
20th-century Scottish musicians
20th-century British composers
21st-century classical pianists
Women music educators
20th-century women composers
21st-century women composers
1937 births
20th-century Scottish women
20th-century women pianists
21st-century women pianists